Charles Laveau Trudeau (1743–1816) also known as Charles Trudeau dit Laveau or Don Carlos Trudeau or Don Carlos Trudeau Laveau, served as the acting mayor of New Orleans in 1812 (May 23 – Oct. 8). His name includes a French honorific, dit Laveau, a tradition often used to carry forward the name of a revered woman in the family; in this case Charles' paternal great-great-grandmother, Marie Catherine de Lavaux (1621, Nancy, Meurthe-et-Moselle, France – 1688, Montreal, Québec, Canada).

Charles Laveau Trudeau was the surveyor general of Spanish Louisiana from the early 1780s until he resigned in 1805 (in the U.S. Territory of Orleans period), or about twenty years. His name on maps and grants is recorded as Don Carlos Trudeau. A few years later, he served as recorder, and as president, of the city council. It was during his tenure as recorder that James Mather resigned and Charles Trudeau became interim mayor.

Charles Trudeau was born in New Orleans during the French regime to Jean-Baptiste Trudeau and Marianne Carrière. He married Charlotte Perrault (or Peyraud). The couple's children were: Caroline, who married Thomas Urquhart; Celestine, who became the second wife of General James Wilkinson; Josephine, who married Manuel Andry, Jr.; and Manette, who married Dr. Josias Eliot Kerr.  He is also the biological grandfather of Marie Laveau, whose mother was Marguerite D'Arcantel (aka Marguerite Toussainte d'Arcantel Henry), a free woman of color.

See also
Lafayette Square (New Orleans), established by Charles Trudeau
Zénon Trudeau, his brother

References

External links
TRUDEAU, Charles Laveau in the Louisiana Historical Association's Dictionary of Louisiana Biography
Charles Trudeau in a New Orleans Public Library transcription of a 1940 WPA compilation. 

1743 births
1816 deaths
People from New Orleans
Mayors of New Orleans